Bennigan's is an Irish pub-themed American casual dining restaurant chain founded in 1976 in Atlanta by restaurateur Norman E. Brinker as one of America's original casual dining concepts. The chain operated under the restaurant division of Pillsbury for most of its history, until Pillsbury was bought out by the British liquor conglomerate Grand Metropolitan. Due to laws preventing liquor manufacturers from also operating liquor sellers, the chain was sold to Texas-based Metromedia restaurants, until the company filed for bankruptcy in 2008. The chain then went through a series of restructuring and ownership changes until it was purchased by Legendary Restaurant Brands, LLC in 2015. The company is now operating out of Dallas, Texas.

History
Bennigan's was established in 1976 in Atlanta, Georgia, as part of the Pillsbury Corporation. The first significant Bennigan's location was opened in Tysons Corner, Virginia, the following year. The concept was the brainchild of company vice president and Steak and Ale founder Norman E. Brinker. By the early 1980s Bennigan's had become one of the best known of the new style mid-range casual dining franchised "fern bar" eating and drinking establishments in the United States. In 1983, Brinker led an exodus of senior management from the S&A and Bennigan's division, purchasing a small regional restaurant concept that focused on gourmet hamburgers, Chili's. Bennigan's continued to grow across the United States, as well as opening locations in fourteen countries.

When Pillsbury was acquired by Grand Metropolitan in 1989 (Grand Met later merged with Guinness in 1997 to become Diageo), the company was spun off. As a major liquor distributor selling such brands as Bombay gin, J&B and other spirits, Grand Metropolitan was bound by "Three-tier" laws that prohibited liquor distributors from owning liquor retailers. S&A management, underwritten by Metromedia, led the leveraged buyout of S&A in 1991

Corporate closure 
The failure of Bennigan's executives to update and grow the restaurant concept, and a degrading quality of their menu items over a period of time, led to a downfall of sales and customer patronage.
John Owens, a Morningstar analyst, was quoted by the Boston Herald as saying: "Bennigan’s was the weakest of the major players" and Bob Goldin, an executive vice president of the restaurant industry consulting group Technomic was quoted by The New York Times as saying:“All these bar and grill concepts are very, very similar, [...] They have the same kind of menu, décor, appeal,” This translated into a lack of customer loyalties.

In May 2006 Bennigans closed most of its New York and New England locations.

In July 2008, all of Bennigan's 150 corporate locations across the US were closed due to parent company Metromedia Restaurant Group of Plano, Texas filing for Chapter 7 bankruptcy protection and initially the firm's 138 franchisee-owned locations remained open, but many later closed in the months and years after the bankruptcy filing. Several international locations, however, remained open. In South Korea, for instance, over 30 locations still operated as usual.

The brand was restructured in 2010 as a result of ownership changes. 
The operator of Bennigan's in South Korea announced that all locations in the country would close by January 31, 2016.

New ownership 
In October 2008, Atalaya Capital Management acquired the Bennigan's and Steak and Ale brands. The assets include the Bennigan's Franchising Co., which owned the rights to franchise the Bennigan's brand and was instrumental in keeping franchise-owned restaurants operating during the bankruptcy period. In a statement by the firm, it was stated that the company planned to reposition the brand by re-establishing its place in the high-margin bar segment and by focusing on sandwiches and appetizers. It also said the company planned to reopen 50 or 60 formerly company-owned Bennigan's locations by finding new or existing franchisees to operate the restaurants.

In May 2011 new management of the firm stated that they wanted to return the brand to its roots but also give Bennigan's new life in the 21st century. In an interview of CEO Paul Mangiamele, he stated that the company's strategy to turn the brand around was multi-pronged. The company planned to introduce a new logo, store prototype, financial and franchise models, an updated menu, improved marketing, adding a catering operation and a new attitude.

On February 11, 2015, CEO Paul Mangiamele and his wife, Gwen, closed on a Management Buy Out (MBO) of the company from its parent private equity firm, for an undisclosed price. The new company, Legendary Restaurant Brands, LLC, is now the owner of the Bennigan's restaurant chain, its fast-casual concept Bennigan's On the Fly, and the Steak and Ale brand.

Recent 
, there are 18 international and 15 United States locations and according to the CEO, Paul Mangiamele, Bennigan's has over 100 units in development including international locations in Amsterdam, Honduras, Guatemala, El Salvador and Pakistan. By the end of 2021, there were 11 domestic locations and 14 international locations listed on the Bennigan's website.

See also
 List of Irish themed restaurants

References

External links

 

Irish-American cuisine
Irish restaurants
Restaurant chains in the United States
Restaurants established in 1976
Companies that have filed for Chapter 7 bankruptcy
Steakhouses in the United States
Re-established companies
Drinking establishment chains in the United States
1976 establishments in Georgia (U.S. state)
American companies established in 1976